Paddy Conlon (fl. c. 1925) was an Australian publican who founded the town of Narembeen, Western Australia.

While a publican in Perth, Conlon and a lawyer friend, Henry Dale, recognised a commercial opportunity to sell alcohol at the railway siding of Narembeen near the teetotal town of Emu Hill. The partners bought land by the railway in 1924, gained a license to build a pub, and then sold off building plots around their new drinking establishment. The new settlement of Narembeen grew at the expense of Emu Hill.

References

Year of birth missing
Year of death missing
History of Western Australia